Scott Robert Timlin (born 26 April 1988), also known as Scotty T, is an English reality TV personality who is best known for appearing on Geordie Shore from 2012 to 2019 and winning Celebrity Big Brother in 2016.

Career
Timlin rose to fame as a cast member in the MTV reality series Geordie Shore, before being axed as a cast member in 2018 after being pictured snorting a suspicious substance. He also appeared on the fourth series of Ex on the Beach and won the seventeenth series of Celebrity Big Brother. He is the second Geordie Shore cast member to win the series, after Charlotte Crosby in 2013. In 2015, Timlin performed with the male stripping troupe Dreamboys doing guest appearances alongside fellow Geordie Shore cast member Gaz Beadle. In March 2016 he was announced as the face of boohooMAN.com. In 2018, Scotty T received a pig tattoo with the phrase "raid my village", a reference to the game Coin Master. He said he got the tattoo when he lost a bet with Charlotte Crosby, and had to get the tattoo as a result. In 2019, Timlin was declared bankrupt with debt of £147,000. In November 2020, he joined OnlyFans and began uploading X-rated content.

Scott's current role includes advertising products on social media as an "influencer". In December 2021 the Advertising Standards Agency publicly reprimanded him for not disclosing financial connections with advertisers and he remains (at time of writing) on their list of "Non-compliant social media influencers".

Filmography

Television

Music videos

Notes

References

External links

Living people
1988 births
Reality show winners
Geordie Shore
People from Newcastle upon Tyne
Participants in British reality television series
OnlyFans creators